Golanjak is a village in Meyghan Rural District, in the Central District of Nehbandan County, South Khorasan Province, Iran. At the 2006 census, its population was 21, in 7 families.

References 

Populated places in Nehbandan County